Attila Márton (born March 14, 1963) is a Hungarian politician, member of the National Assembly (MP) for Hajdúszoboszló (Hajdú-Bihar County Constituency VII) from 2002 to 2014. He was also a Member of Parliament from Fidesz Hajdú Bihar County Regional List between 1998 and 2002.

Biography
He finished the car mechanics course of Landler Jenő Secondary Technical School at Debrecen in 1981. He graduated as a traffic process engineer with IT and business specialisation from the College of Transport and Telecommunications of Győr in 1984. He received a university degree in IT systems analysis in Debrecen in 1991 having accomplished the joint programme of Kossuth Lajos University of Debrecen. From 1984 he worked as a logistics manager. From 1988 until his election as MP in 1998 he worked in different positions for the Hajdúszoboszló headquarters of the Trans-Tisza Gas Supply Company in the field of business information technology including systems host, project manager, then senior IT staff. He has been active as a sports pilot since 1979 and has been on the board of the Hungarian Association of Aviation since 1998. He presided over the Association from 2000 to 2002.

Political career
Márton started his political career in December 1993 upon the invitation of Fidesz. He ran in the national and local elections for the first time in 1994. He has been a member of Fidesz since May 1994 and a member of the Hajdú-Bihar County Board since 1996. In the 1998 general election he secured a mandate from the Hajdú-Bihar County Regional List of Fidesz. He became a member of the Economic Committee in the same year and chaired the Ad Hoc Subcommittee Examining the Operation of Dunaferr Company.

In the 2002 election he secured a seat as an individual MP representing Hajdúszoboszló, Constituency VII, Hajdú-Bihar County. In the general election held in 2006, he was elected MP again. He was appointed a member of the Economic and Information Technology Committee. He defended his mandate in the 2010 parliamentary election.

References

1963 births
Living people
Fidesz politicians
Members of the National Assembly of Hungary (1998–2002)
Members of the National Assembly of Hungary (2002–2006)
Members of the National Assembly of Hungary (2006–2010)
Members of the National Assembly of Hungary (2010–2014)
People from Debrecen